Francesco di Tommaso Soderini (10 June 1453 – 17 May 1524) was a major diplomatic and Church figure of Renaissance Italy, and brother of Piero Soderini. He was an adversary of the Medici family.

Biography
On 27 Mar 1486, he was ordained a priest by Rinaldo Orsini, Archbishop of Florence.
He became Bishop of Volterra in 1478, by nomination, resigning in 1509. In 1487, he was ordained and received his cardinalate in 1503, supported by Louis XII of France. He was Bishop of Cortona from 1504–1505 and held further church posts.

He was complicit in the plot of fellow Cardinals Bandinello Sauli and Alfonso Petrucci against Leo X for the benefit of Cardinal Riario; he went into voluntary exile in 1517, returning to Rome in 1521.

References and notes

Bibliography

 K. J. P. Lowe, Church and Politics in Renaissance Italy: The Life and Career of Cardinal Francesco Soderini, 1453-1524

External links

1453 births
1524 deaths
16th-century Italian cardinals
Cardinal-bishops of Albano
Cardinal-bishops of Ostia
Cardinal-bishops of Palestrina
Cardinal-bishops of Porto
Cardinal-bishops of Sabina
Cardinals created by Pope Alexander VI
Bishops of Anagni
Bishops of Cortona
Bishops of Narni
Bishops of Saintes
Bishops of Tivoli
Bishops of Volterra
15th-century Italian Roman Catholic bishops
16th-century Italian Roman Catholic bishops